Playin' It Cool is the debut solo studio album by American musician Timothy B. Schmit, the bass guitarist and co-lead vocalist for the Eagles. The album was released in 1984 on Asylum in the United States and Europe. The album features guest appearances from Don Henley, Joe Walsh, Steve Lukather, Carl Wilson, J.D. Souther and Rita Coolidge.

Critical reception
Reviewing for AllMusic, critic Rob Theakston wrote of the album "The production on several of these tunes sound antiquated in comparison to the super glossed production of the mid-eighties; almost reminiscent of Schmit's tunes in the Eagles. It certainly doesn't help matters that many of his Southern California compadres (Henley, Carl Wilson, Joe Walsh and JD Souther) make guest appearances, leading to the notion that Playin' It Cool is an album that was several years in the making. It's not the worst of Eagles solo records, but it is certainly nowhere near the best either."

Track listing

Personnel

Musicians

 Timothy B. Schmit – vocals, bass (1–4, 8), backing vocals (1, 2, 4), guitars (5), percussion (7)
 Vince Melamed – keyboards (1, 2, 4, 6–8)
 David Paich – keyboards (6, 7), percussion (6)
 Michael Utley – organ (9)
 Josh Leo – guitars (1), percussion (2), backing vocals (2), first guitar solo (4, 9), acoustic guitar (7), rhythm guitar (9), bass (9), chorus harmony vocals (9)
 Steve Lukather – second and end guitar solos (4), guitars (6, 8), electric guitar (7)
 Joe Walsh – slide guitar (4), third guitar solo (4), second and end guitar solos (9)
 Bob Glaub – bass (6, 7)
 Craig Krampf – drums (1, 9), percussion (2)
 Harry Stinson – Simmons snare drum (2), Roland TR-808 (2)
 John Robinson – drums (3)
 Don Henley – percussion (2), drums (4), backing vocals (4)
 Jeff Porcaro – drums (6–8), percussion (6, 7), tambourine (8)
 Keith Knudsen – tambourine (9)
 Greg Smith – baritone saxophone (6)
 Bill Bergman – tenor saxophone (6)
 Jim Coile – tenor saxophone (6)
 Steve Allen – tenor saxophone (8)
 Sam Clayton – backing vocals (1)
 J.D. Souther – backing vocals (1, 6)
 Carl Wilson – backing vocals (2)
 Rita Coolidge – backing vocals (9)
 Max Gronenthal – backing vocals (9)
 David Lasley – backing vocals (9)

Cheers on "Playin' It Cool"
 Jean Cromie
 Carole Damien 
 Debra Dobkin
 Joan Kreiss
 Jeddrah Schmit
 Jay Harris
 Renee Larose Leo
 Lindah K. Lauderbough

Production
 Josh Leo – producer (1, 4–9)
 Timothy B. Schmit – producer (1, 4–9), cover concept 
 Russ Titleman – producer (3)
 Niko Bolas – recording (1, 2, 4–9), mixing 
 Mark Linett – engineer (3)
 Richard Bosworth – second engineer, assistant engineer, mix assistant 
 Denny Densmore – second engineer
 Larry Hinds – second engineer
 Bob Loftus – second engineer 
 Duane Seykora – second engineer 
 Ernie Sheesley – second engineer
 Wayne Tanouye – second engineer
 Joe Gastwirt – mastering 
 Dan Hersch – mastering assistant 
 Bruce Ayers – cover concept
 Jean Cromie – cover concept
 Gary Burden – cover concept, art direction, design 
 Jenice Heo – art direction, design 
 Henry Diltz – photography

Chart performance

Album

Singles

References

External links
 

1984 albums
Timothy B. Schmit albums
Albums produced by Josh Leo
Asylum Records albums